Medy is both a given name and a surname. Notable people with the name include:

 Camille Médy (1902–1989), French cross-country skier
 Medy Elito (born 1990), Zairian footballer
 Medy van der Laan (born 1968), Dutch politician